Reinhold Olesch (September 24, 1910 in Kattowitz (Upper Silesia) – June 23, 1990 in Cologne) was a linguist, Slavic studies Professor of University of Vienna. He researched the Slavonic dialects of Upper Silesia, which he recognized as his mother tongue. He published several works about them, including: "Die slawischen Dialekte Oberschlesiens" (Slavonic dialects of Upper Silesia) and "Beiträge zur oberschlesischen Dialektforschung – Die Mundart der Kobylorze".

References 
 

1910 births
1990 deaths
People from Katowice
Linguists from Germany
People from the Province of Silesia
Linguists of Silesian
20th-century linguists